Blaker Station is a railway station located in Blaker in Sørum, Norway on the Kongsvinger Line. The station was built in 1862 as part of the Kongsvinger Line. The station is served hourly, with extra rush hour departures, by the Oslo Commuter Rail line R14 operated by Vy.

External links
 Norwegian National Rail Administration's page on Blaker

Railway stations in Sørum
Railway stations on the Kongsvinger Line
Railway stations opened in 1862
1862 establishments in Norway